Haspin, widely known as Hispin, is a religious Israeli settlement organized as a community settlement located in the southern Golan Heights.

The international community  considers Israeli settlements in the Golan Heights illegal under international law, but the Israeli government disputes this.

History
The modern Haspin was established in 1978 at the site of the abandoned village Khisfin. During G. Schumacher's visit to the village in 1883, it was inhabited by about 270 souls, living in some 60 huts. Three-fourths of the village already lay waste or deserted.

Haspin now falls under the municipal jurisdiction of the Golan Regional Council.
Yeshivat HaGolan, a Hesder Yeshiva is located in the town.

Haspin (Khisfin) is first mentioned in sources describing the military exploits of Judas Maccabeus (I Maccabbees 5:26), under the name Chaspho. The town features prominently in the early rabbinic writings of the 3rd century CE (corresponding with the late Roman-early Byzantine period), under the name Hisfiyya. It is also mentioned in the 3rd century-4th century Mosaic of Rehob.

Geographical description
Haspin lies on the northern border of the most-productive agricultural region of the southern Golan Heights, which, in ages past, was part of the main road leading up from Hamat Gader and from the Yarmuk valley to the northern regions of the Golan (Jaulan) as far as Hauran. An ancient Roman road criss-crossed the region. The area is rich in natural springs.

Archaeology
Many ancient artefacts from the Roman and Byzantine periods have been unearthed in Haspin.

This is probably the fortified caravanserai (khan) described by Gottlieb Schumacher in his book The Jaulân, situated west of the town of Haspin. According to Oliphant, the fortress dates from the Early Arab period, and was used by the Crusaders in a later period. Its location is currently unknown.

Notable People 

Maximus the Confessor, Christian monk, theologian and scholar was born in ancient Haspin (Khifsin), though this is disputed. 

Bezalel Smotrich, leader of the Religious Zionist Party and former Israeli Minister of Transportation, was born in Haspin.

See also
 Israeli-occupied territories

References

Religious Israeli settlements
Golan Regional Council
 Community settlements
Religious Israeli communities
Populated places in Northern District (Israel)
Populated places established in 1978
1978 establishments in the Israeli Military Governorate